Nabadwip Bakultala High School is a government-aided higher secondary boys' school situated at Nabadwip, West Bengal, India. This school was established in 1875 during British Colonial period of India. This school is now from class V to XII (Arts, Science & Commerce streams).

History 
This school was founded primarily with the name 'Nabadwip Banga Vidyalaya' in the year 1875 at another place, where now situated a girls' school namely Nabadwip Bakultala Balika Vidyalaya. In those days, the surrounding remained in cheery echoing of children. As lessons were started under a Spanish Cheery tree ('বকুল' in Bengali language), it came to be known as 'Bakultala school' by the people.

Every year 3 January is observed as the establishment day of school. Though it was a primary school at the time of foundation, now the primary section is not running. It became a high school in 1924. The first secretary of the school was Jana Ranjan Roy (1925 - 1928) and the first president was the S.D.O. (Ex-officio) of Sadar Subdivision, Nadia (01/01/1925 - 23/12/1966). Headmasters Shri Shashibhushan Tarafdar (1924 - 1942) and Shri Nityaniranjan Kabiraj (1942 - 1960) are being remembered greatly in the history of the school. This school has produced a large number of successful students helped by many remarkable teachers.

About School 
 This school is situated beside Nabadwip Municipality. There are about 40 classrooms distributed among two three-storied and one one-storied building. There are laboratories of Physics, Chemistry, Biology, Geography etc subjects. Students can take part in N C C . Now there are 34 teachers and 9 teaching-staffs in this school. Nabadwip Bakultala High School is one of the best and oldest Higher secondary schools of Nabadwip as well as Nadia district. Near about 1450 students read in this school.   

There is also an organisation of ex-students named 'Nabadwip Bakultala Vidyalaya Praktan Chhatra Sammilani'.

Various cultural events are being observed in the school, among them Saraswati puja gets one of the highest priority and repute.       

Much desired main gate was inaugurated recently. After remaining stopped for some years, the yearly magazine 'Bakulkatha' was published in 2018. Every year the handwritten wall-magazine 'Bakulkunri' (বকুলকুঁড়ি) is being published as well.

Medium 
Mainly the learning medium is Bengali. Alongside in 2018, English medium has started.

Notable alumni 

 Samar Ghosh, Ex-Chief secretary of Government of West Bengal 
 Gour Kishore Ghosh, Writer 
 Swami Suhitananda
 Shri Manojkumar Sur
 Shri Ratneshwar Ray
Ujjwal Maulik, Scientist and Professor of Jadavpur University

References

External links 
Nabadwip Bakultala Praktan Chhatra Sammilani

1875 establishments in India
Boys' schools in India
Government schools in India
Schools in West Bengal
Schools in Nadia district
Schools in Colonial India